East West (or East and West) may refer to:
East–West dichotomy, the contrast between Eastern and Western society or culture

Arts and entertainment

Books, journals and magazines
East, West, an anthology of short stories written by Salman Rushdie
East and West (book), a 1998 book by Christopher Patten, the last British governor of Hong Kong
Philosophy East and West, an international, interdisciplinary academic journal
East and West, a quarterly English-language journal published 1950 to 2009 by the Istituto Italiano per l'Africa e l'Oriente

Film, TV and theatre
 East and West (film), a 1923 Austrian silent film
East/West (also known as Est-Ouest), a 1999 film by Régis Wargnier
East West Players, an Asian American theatre organization
East West 101, an Australian television drama series
Purab Aur Paschim (East and West), a 1970 Bollywood movie

Music
East-West (The Butterfield Blues Band album), 1966
East West (Julia Fordham album), 1997
East West (East West album), 2003
East/West (album), 2005, by Bill Frisell
East West (band), a Christian metal band
East and West (album), a 1963 jazz album by Toshiko Akiyoshi and Charlie Mariano
East West Records, an American record label
"East West", a 1966 single by Herman's Hermits, later covered by Morrissey

Companies and institutions
East-West Airlines (India), a former airline
East-West Airlines (Australia), a former airline
East West Bank, a Chinese American bank in California
East West Bank (Philippines), a commercial bank
East West Bus Company, a bus and coach operator in Melbourne, Australia
East West University, Dhaka, Bangladesh
East–West University, Chicago, Illinois, US
East and West Railroad of Alabama, a railroad in the US states of Alabama and Georgia
East and West Riding Regiment, British Territorial Army

Other uses
 Two of the four cardinal directions
 A prime vertical direction
East–West Highway (New England), a proposed highway corridor
East West Line (disambiguation)
The East–West Schism, the 1054 break between the Roman Catholic and Eastern Orthodox churches
East–West Shrine Game, an annual college football game
East-west traffic, computer network traffic within a data center
East Coast–West Coast hip hop rivalry, the 1990s feud between American hip hop enthusiasts